The 2013 GP Ouest-France was the 77th edition of the GP Ouest-France, a single-day cycling race. It was the twenty-fourth race of the 2013 UCI World Tour season.

The race was won by 's Filippo Pozzato, Pozzato finished ahead 's Giacomo Nizzolo and 's Samuel Dumoulin, who completed the podium.

Teams
As the GP Ouest-France was a UCI World Tour event, all 19 UCI ProTeams were invited automatically and obligated to send a squad. Five other squads were given wildcard places into the race, and as such, formed the event's 24-team peloton.

The 24 teams that competed in the race were:

 †

 †

 †

 †
 †

Results

External links

GP Ouest-France
GP Ouest-France
Bretagne Classic